is a former Japanese football player.

Club statistics

References

External links

1981 births
Living people
Kokushikan University alumni
Association football people from Ishikawa Prefecture
Japanese footballers
J2 League players
Japan Football League players
Thespakusatsu Gunma players
Association football goalkeepers